James Wynne may refer to:
 James Wynne (rugby league) (born 1976), Australian rugby player for France
 James Wynne (rower) (born 1937), American Olympian
 James J. Wynne, American physicist
 James Wynne (died 1709), soldier and MP for Leitrim (Parliament of Ireland constituency)
 James Wynne (died 1748), MP for Sligo County (Parliament of Ireland constituency)

See also
 James Wynn (disambiguation)